Simnica is a village in the municipality of Gostivar, North Macedonia.

Demographics
As of the 2021 census, Simnica had 183 residents with the following ethnic composition:
Albanians 159
Persons for whom data are taken from administrative sources 24

According to the 2002 census, the village had a total of 430 inhabitants. Ethnic groups in the village include:

Albanians 424
Others 6

References

External links

Villages in Gostivar Municipality
Albanian communities in North Macedonia